Meir Cohen (born 15 November 1955) is an Israeli politician. A former mayor of Dimona, Cohen is currently a member of the Knesset for Yesh Atid and Minister of Welfare and Social Services. He previously held the position from 2013–2014.

Biography

Born in Essaouira in Morocco, Cohen immigrated to Israel with his family at the age of seven. After initially settling in Yeruham, they moved to Dimona and were one of its founding families. He studied at the Lehman school in Dimona. In 1973, Cohen was drafted into the Israel Defense Forces, joined the Paratroopers Brigade, and fought in the Yom Kippur War. He attended Ben-Gurion University of the Negev where he gained a bachelor's degree in history. Cohen earned a master's degree in Jewish Studies after graduating from the Schechter Institute in Jerusalem. He later worked as a headteacher in Dimona.

He joined Yisrael Beiteinu and ran for mayor of Dimona in 2003, and was elected with 42% of the vote. He was elected for a second term in 2008, and was expected to win a third term in 2013. During his tenure numerous factories opened, the city's first mall was built, unemployment dropped, he built cultural and youth centers, and led the efforts to lower the price of water. In October 2012 he joined Yesh Atid after being courted by the party for several months.

In addition to serving as mayor of Dimona, Cohen was also a member of the board of directors of the Jewish Agency.

In the lead-up to the 2013 Knesset elections Cohen was placed fourth on the list of the new Yesh Atid party, entering the Knesset as the party won 19 seats. He was appointed Minister of Welfare and Social Services, a post he held until resigning on 2 December 2014. He was placed fourth on the party's list for the 2015 elections, and was re-elected as the party won 11 seats.

References

External links

1955 births
Living people
Ben-Gurion University of the Negev alumni
Israeli educators
Israeli people of Moroccan-Jewish descent
Jewish Israeli politicians
Mayors of places in Israel
Government ministers of Israel
Members of the 19th Knesset (2013–2015)
Members of the 20th Knesset (2015–2019)
Members of the 21st Knesset (2019)
Members of the 22nd Knesset (2019–2020)
Members of the 23rd Knesset (2020–2021)
Members of the 24th Knesset (2021–2022)
Members of the 25th Knesset (2022–)
Moroccan emigrants to Israel
20th-century Moroccan Jews
People from Essaouira
Politicians from Dimona
Yesh Atid politicians
Yisrael Beiteinu politicians
Deputy Speakers of the Knesset
People from Yeruham